Noncommutative measure and integration refers to the theory of weights, states, and traces on von Neumann algebras (Takesaki 1979 v. 2 p. 141).

References
I. E. Segal. A noncommutative extension of abstract integration. Ann. of Math. (2), 57:401–457, 1953. MR # 14:991f, JSTOR collection. 2.0(2)
.
 

Operator algebras
Noncommutative geometry